István Konkoly (5 March 1930 – 20 November 2017) was a Hungarian prelate of the Roman Catholic Church, who served as Bishop of Szombathely from 1987 to 2006.

Konkoly died on 20 November 2017, at the age of 87.

Works
 Hittan ismeretek. Felkészülés a beavató szentségek felvételére; ed. Konkoly, István; Egyházmegyei Hatóság, Szombathely, 2000
 Sill Aba, Ferenc – Konkoly, István: A szombathelyi Püspöki Palota; MG Kereskedelmi és Szolgáltató Bt., Szombathely, 2004
 "Hirdessétek az evangéliumot...". Válogatás Konkoly István szombathelyi püspök főpásztori szolgálata alatt elhangzott beszédeiből, előadásaiból és interjúiból, 1987-2004, 1-2.; ed. Rába Imre; Szombathelyi Egyházmegyei Hatóság, Szombathely, 2005
 Emlékeim püspöki szolgálatom idejéből, 1987-2015; Szülőföld, Szombathely–Gencsapáti, 2015

References

1930 births
2017 deaths
20th-century Roman Catholic bishops in Hungary
21st-century Roman Catholic bishops in Hungary
People from Zala County
Bishops of Szombathely